Meredith Artley is a journalist and former editor in chief of CNN.com.

Biography
She has served as elected president of the Online News Association, and on their board of directors. Prior to joining CNN, she led digital editorial efforts for the Los Angeles Times, the International Herald Tribune and The New York Times. She is a graduate of the University of Missouri.

See also 
 Online News Association

References

External links 
 CNN's Leadership Team

American women journalists
CNN
The New York Times people
University of Missouri alumni
Living people
Year of birth missing (living people)